The large moth subfamily Lymantriinae contains the following genera beginning with I:

References 

Lymantriinae
Lymantriid genera I